Tindivanam is a town and a municipality in Viluppuram district in the Indian state of Tamil Nadu. It is the second largest town in Villupuram District after the headquarters town Villupuram. Important roads from north to south (NH 45) Tamil Nadu pass through Tindivanam and similarly from west to east (NH 66).

History
Tindivanam was earlier known as (திந்திரிவனம்) due to the shivan (Eswaran) temple located at Tindivanam.
The name of Shiva(Suyambu linga) located there is திந்திரிஈஸ்வர். (Thinthrineeswarar) with Maragadhambigai Amman is a Thevara Vaipu Sthalam.
Tindivanam is a Selection grade Municipal Town. Tindivanam was constituted as a Municipality in 01.04.1949 then it was upgraded as 2nd grade Municipality from 03.04.1970, 1st grade Municipality in 22.05.98 and Selection Grade in 02.12.2008.

Ennairam, located near Tindivanam, has inscriptions about the Hindu shastras that date back to the 11th century. The Chola temple of Narasimma swamy koil built by Rajaraja Chola 1 (985 –1010) and has reached 1,000 years. 8,000 samanaras lived in this village. As of 2011, the town had a population of 72,796.

Etymology

It was initially known as "Tinthrivanam"(Jungle of Tamarind-புளியங்காடு) where "Tinthiri" means 'tamarind' and "vanam" means 'Jungle' in Tamil.

Geography
It has an average elevation of 58 metres (190 feet). Tindivanam is one among the three sub-divisions of Viluppuram District, Tamil Nadu. Tindivanam is divided into 234 Revenue Villages under Tindivanam Taluk.

Tindivanam is at the junction of roads going to Tiruchirapalli, Pondicherry, Thiruvannamalai, Kanchipuram, Viluppuram, Thellar, Marakkanam and Chennai.

Demographics

According to 2011 census, Tindivanam had a population of 72,796 with a sex-ratio of 1,003 females for every 1,000 males, much above the national average of 929. A total of 7,664 were under the age of six, constituting 3,922 males and 3,742 females. Scheduled Castes and Scheduled Tribes accounted for 16.59% and 0.49% of the population respectively. The average literacy of the town was 78.19%, compared to the national average of 72.99%. The town had a total of 17,088 households. There were a total of 24,415 workers, comprising 595 cultivators, 672 main agricultural labourers, 465 in house hold industries, 19,541 other workers, 3,142 marginal workers, 51 marginal cultivators, 431 marginal agricultural labourers, 207 marginal workers in household industries and 2,453 other marginal workers. As per the religious census of 2011, Tindivanam had 82.16% Hindus, 11.95% Muslims, 4.39% Christians, 0.04% Sikhs, 0.02% Buddhists, 1.36% Jains, 0.08% following other religions and 0.0% following no religion or did not indicate any religious preference.

Climate 
Tindivanam's climate is classified as tropical. In winter, there is much less rainfall in Tindivanam than in summer. The Köppen-Geiger climate classification is Aw. The average annual temperature is 28.4 °C in Tindivanam. At an average temperature of 32.3 °C, May is the hottest month of the year. January has the lowest average temperature of the year. During the year, the average temperatures vary by 7.8 °C.

Transport

Road 
Tindivanam is connected by roads to major cities and to the rest of the state. The major National Highways in the town are

 National Highway 32 (India) which connects Chennai and Tuticorn via Tindivanam, Puducherry, Cuddalore and Nagapattinam.
 National Highway 77 (India) which connects Tindivanam and Uthangarai via Tiruvannamalai and joins National Highway 48 (India) at Krishnagiri.
 National Highway 132 (India) which connects Tindivanam and Viluppuram.

Rail 

Tindivanam railway station is a railway station serving Tindivanam, a city and taluk headquarters in Viluppuram district, Tamil Nadu. It is a station on the South line of the Chennai Suburban Railway and comes under the Chennai railway division of the Southern Railway Zone. The station code is TMV.

Air 
Pondicherry Airport is connected to Bangalore and Hyderabad by commercial airlines.

Politics 

 Tindivanam assembly constituency is part of Villupuram (Lok Sabha constituency) (up to 2009 Tindivanam was a Lok Sabha constituency).
Tindivanam legislative assembly:
Member of legislative assembly : Seethapathy P
 Tindivanam Municipal Council:
 Chairman: nil
 Vice chairman
 Commissioner: S.Annadurai, B.A.

Notable people 
 O. P. Ramaswamy Reddiyar
 S. Ramadoss
 Anbumani Ramadoss
 Tindivanam K. Ramamurthy
 C. V. Shanmugam

Oil Seed Research Station 
Oilseeds Research Station  is located in a distance of 3 km from Tindivanam town. Started as Agricultural Research Station in 1935, later inducted with Tamilnadu Agricultural University in the year 1981. Oilseeds Research Station has been established by Govt of Tamilnadu to evolve groundnut, sesame and castor varieties with desirable attributes viz., short duration, high yield, high oil content, drought tolerance, fresh seed dormancy, resistance to major insect pests and diseases etc. Groundnut (Has separate Kolmudal Nilayalam (Tamil)) & Oil seeds research station – affiliated to the Tamil Nadu Agricultural University

 Pioneer research station in Tamil Nadu exclusively for oilseeds.
 Started as Agricultural Research Station in 1935
 Upgraded as Regional Research Station in 1962
 Renamed as Oilseeds Research Station and brought under Tamil Nadu
 Agricultural University in 1981

Temples 

 Mailam or Mayilam is located 15 kilometres from Tindivanam.
 Chandramouleeswar temple, Thiruvakkarai
 Shri Lakshmi Narasimmar temple, Tindivanam
 Shri Nerkuthi Vinayagar temple, Theevanur
 Shri Bheemeshwarar temple, Omandur
 Shri Agastheeshwarar temple, Kiliyanur
 Shri Maragathambigai Sametha Thindrinishvarar temple, Tindivanam

Enga Ooru Tindivanam flyover 

The Enga Ooru Tindivanam flyover is the state's second railways flyover, which was built under the former union Minister Tindivanam G.Venkatraman, who was the minister for surface transport government of India and Member of parliament of Tindivanam constituency. The foundation was laid by former union Minister Murasoli Maran on 02/02 1997, which uplifted the town on various departments and solved so many issues in and around Tindivanam town. It has roundana and four lanes. The flyover is located in the heart of the Tindivanam, between NH 66 (Bangalore – Pondicherry) and NH 45 (Chennai - Dindukkal). This flyover was inaugurated by Tamil Nadu Chief Minister M. Karunanithi in 2000. This flyover was constructed at a cost of Rs.22 crores.

National Fossil Wood Park 

National Fossil Wood Park, Tiruvakkarai is a notified National Geo-heritage Monument located in the Villupuram District in the Indian state of Tamil Nadu and is maintained by the Geological Survey of India. The park was established in 1940 and is located 1 km east of Thiruvakkarai village on the road between Tindivanam and Pondicherry. The park contains petrified wood fossils approximately 20 million years old, scattered throughout the park, which covers about 247 acres (100 ha). The park consists of nine enclaves, but only a small portion of the 247 acres (approx 1 square km) is open to the public. Officials of the GSI believe the fossils were formed during massive flooding that occurred millions of years ago. The park hosts about 200 fossilized trees.

References

Cities and towns in Viluppuram district